Sergio Ezequiel Araujo (born 28 January 1992), nicknamed El Chino, is an Argentine professional footballer who plays as a forward for Greek Super League club AEK Athens, for which he is captain.

Club career

Boca Juniors
Born in Buenos Aires, Araujo graduated with Boca Juniors' youth setup. He played his first match as a professional on 13 December 2009, coming on as a late substitute for Nicolás Gaitán in a 0–2 home loss against Banfield for the Primera División championship.

Araujo scored his first professional goal on 21 November 2010, netting the first in a 2–1 home win against Arsenal de Sarandí. However, he was mainly used as a backup to Pablo Mouche and Lucas Viatri, appearing sparingly.

On 25 July 2012, Araujo moved abroad for the first time in his career, signing a two-year loan deal with Barcelona and being assigned to the reserves in Segunda División. He made his debut for the club on 17 August, playing the last 36 minutes of the 4–5 home loss against UD Almería.

Araujo scored his first goals for Barça B on 1 December, netting a brace in a 2–1 away win against Lugo. He finished the campaign with seven goals in 34 appearances, but returned to his parent club on 25 June 2013 nonetheless.

On 17 July 2013, Araujo was loaned to Tigre, after being deemed surplus to requirements by manager Carlos Bianchi. He appeared in 19 matches for the club, scoring four goals; he was sent off on 28 September in a 1–0 home win over Colón for an aggression against Maximiliano Caire.

Las Palmas
On 19 July 2014, Araujo returned to Spain, joining Las Palmas in a season-long loan deal. He made his debut for the Canarians on 23 August, starting and scoring the last in a 2–0 home win against UE Llagostera. Las Palmas came fourth and made the play-offs, in which Araujo opened a 1–1 draw at Real Valladolid in the first leg of the semi-finals; he missed a penalty in added time in the goalless second as his team advanced on the away goals rule. On 21 June 2015, in the final second leg against Real Zaragoza at the Estadio Gran Canaria, he scored an 84th-minute goal that made it 2–0 on the night, 3–3 on aggregate, thus sending Los Amarillos into La Liga via the same rule.

Araujo appeared in 43 matches and scored 25 goals over the season for the Canary Islands outfit, being the club's top goalscorer and the second overall. Despite strong links to a move to Celtic and Real Sociedad the club managed to buy him outright, with the player signing a five-year deal.

On 22 August 2015, Araujo made his La Liga debut, starting in a 0–1 away loss against Atlético Madrid. He scored his first goal in the category on 13 September, netting his team's first in a 3–3 draw at Celta de Vigo.

First loan to AEK Athens
On 24 January 2017, Araujo joined AEK Athens on loan until the end of the season with an option to extend for a further year. A week later, he scored twice in his debut, a 6–0 home win over Levadiakos for the Greek Cup. On 6 March 2017 he scored his first Superleague Greece goal in a 1–1 away draw against rivals Panionios, and six days later he scored two of his team's three goals in the "double-headed eagle" derby against PAOK.

On 13 April 2017, he opened the score in a 2–1 away Greek Cup semifinals first leg win against champions Olympiacos. On 31 May, he scored the second goal of a 2–1 away win against Panionios and his team qualified for the UEFA Champions League. At the end of the season he returned to Las Palmas.

Second loan to AEK Athens
On 30 August 2017, Araujo returned to AEK on a season long-loan for a fee of €700,000. He scored nine goals at the domestic competitions during the second part of 2016–17 season. He combined his return with a goal in 4–0 home win against AEL.  On 23 November 2017 he scored his first goal in UEFA competitions in a 2–2 home draw against Rijeka.  On 14 January he scored a brace in a 3–1 home win against PAS Giannina.  On 1 April 2018, Araujo's brace helped AEK to a 3–0 Athens derby win over Panathinaikos. On 5 May 2018, AEK celebrated their first title in 24 years after his goal secured a 1–0 away victory over Apollon Smyrnis at the Georgios Kamaras Stadium.

Las Palmas stated that Araujo would not be sold as his release clause was €60 million.

Third loan to AEK Athens
On 31 January 2020, AEK loaned Araujo from Las Palmas for the remainder of the season for a fee of €500,000. However, there is a reported clause in the deal which means that if AEK didn't decide to purchase Araujo on a permanent basis for €2.7 million after the campaign ends, they will have to pay a hefty compensation fee to Las Palmas. On 9 February 2020, Araujo scored his first goal since rejoining AEK, after eight minutes of a 1–0 win over city rivals Panathinaikos at the Olympic Stadium in the Super League Athenian derby.

AEK Athens
On 16 July 2021, Araujo signed a three-year deal with AEK, that cost AEK nearly €1.5 million, with 20% of the transfer going to Argentinian club Boca Juniors, which held a stake in the Argentine's resale. Araujo has played in 79 matches for the team, and scored 26 goals in all competitions, as a loanee in the previous years. On 22 September, he scored the only goal against Lamia. On 21 November 2021, he scored a brace but he did not avert a 3–2 home loss against rivals Olympiacos. On 6 February 2022, Araujo scored a brace, celebrating his 100th appearance with the club and named MVP in a 3–0 home win game against Apollon Smyrnis.

International career
In 2009 Araujo represented Argentina at the South American U-17 Championship. He scored three goals in five appearances as side eventually finished second and qualified for the FIFA U-17 World Cup.

Araujo also appeared in 2009 FIFA U-17 World Cup held in Nigeria, scoring a 59th-minute winner against Honduras in Argentina's opening game, as well as a 58th-minute winner in a 2–1 victory against Germany in Argentina's second game. Argentina progressed to the round of 16, where he scored to put them 2–0 ahead of Colombia. However, Colombia would end up winning the game 3–2.

Araujo represented the Argentina U-23 national team at the 2011 Pan American Games in Guadalajara, Mexico. He scored in Argentina's opening 1–1 draw with Brazil, but was sent off in the 85th minute. Argentina reached the final, where they lost 1–0 against hosts Mexico.

Honours
Boca Juniors
Primera División: 2011 Apertura

AEK Athens
Super League Greece: 2017–18
Individual
Segunda División Player of the Month: 2014 September
AEK Athens Player of the Year: 2021–22
Super League Greece Goal of the Year: 2021–22
Super League Greece Team of the Year: 2021–22
Panhellenic Professional Football Players Association Fair Play Award: 2021–22

References

External links

Barcelona official profile

1992 births
Living people
Footballers from Buenos Aires
Argentine footballers
Association football forwards
Argentine Primera División players
La Liga players
Segunda División players
Super League Greece players
Boca Juniors footballers
Club Atlético Tigre footballers
FC Barcelona Atlètic players
UD Las Palmas players
AEK Athens F.C. players
Argentina youth international footballers
Argentina under-20 international footballers
Footballers at the 2011 Pan American Games
Argentine expatriate footballers
Argentine expatriate sportspeople in Spain
Argentine expatriate sportspeople in Greece
Expatriate footballers in Spain
Expatriate footballers in Greece
Pan American Games medalists in football
Pan American Games silver medalists for Argentina
Medalists at the 2011 Pan American Games